Aoraia enysii, also known as the forest ghost moth is a species of moth of the family Hepialidae. It is endemic to New Zealand. This is the only species of the genus Aoraia that can be found in the North as well as the South Island. This species can be found from Mount Te Aroha southwards. This species was described by Arthur Gardiner Butler in 1877 from a specimen obtained in the North Island by J. D. Enys.

The wingspan is 60–74 mm for males and 78–110 mm for females. The forewing pattern is intricate and consists of varying shades of brown with ash-white markings, sometimes with subterminal patches of yellowish scales. The hindwings are yellowish-brown, fawn or smoky. Adults are on wing from February to May.

The larvae can be found in pit traps or in litter on the forest floor. They feed on leaf litter.

References

External links

Observations by citizen scientists

Moths described in 1877
Hepialidae
Moths of New Zealand
Endemic fauna of New Zealand
Endemic moths of New Zealand